James Bert Modesitt (November 24, 1875 – September 13, 1946) was an American football and baseball coach. He was the 12th head football coach at Wabash College in Crawfordsville, Indiana, serving for two seasons, from 1898 to 1899, and compiling a record of 3–5–2. Modesitt was the first coach at Wabash to hold the post for more than one season.  Modesitt was also the head baseball coach at Wabash in 1899, tallying a mark of 2–6.

Head coaching record

Football

References

External links
 

1875 births
1946 deaths
Wabash Little Giants baseball coaches
Wabash Little Giants football coaches
Sportspeople from Terre Haute, Indiana